Maurice Robinson (16 July 1921 – 8 August 1994) was an Irish cricketer active from 1942 to 1954 who played for Glamorgan and Warwickshire. He was born in Lisburn and died in Bromsgrove. He appeared in 83 first-class matches as a righthanded batsman who bowled right arm fast medium. He scored 2,719 runs with a highest score of 190 among two centuries and took 34 wickets with a best performance of seven for 51. During the Second World War, he was stationed in India where he represented the Europeans cricket team and played for both Hyderabad and Madras.

Notes

 
1921 births
1994 deaths
Irish cricketers
Glamorgan cricketers
Warwickshire cricketers
Europeans cricketers
Hyderabad cricketers
Tamil Nadu cricketers
Combined Services cricketers
British Army personnel of World War II